Clam sauce (Italian “alle vongole”) is a topping for pasta, usually linguine. The two most popular varieties are white, usually featuring minced clams, olive oil, garlic, lemon juice or white wine, and parsley, or red, usually a thin tomato sauce with minced clams. Other variants include the incorporation of whole clams, hot pepper flakes and other ingredients. Clam juice may be used in the preparation of clam sauce.

See also
 List of clam dishes
 List of sauces

References 

Italian sauces
Sauce